The Barcelona–Vallès Line is an unconnected standard gauge rapid transit and commuter railway line linking Barcelona with Sabadell and Terrassa via the Collserola mountain range, in Catalonia, Spain. Its name refers to the Catalan historical region of Vallès, whereby most part of the line runs. Plaça de Catalunya station serves as the Barcelona terminus of the line, where almost all its trains either start or terminate. The line then continues northwards and branches off twice before leaving the city limits. Its main route splits in two in Sant Cugat del Vallès, forming two major branches to Sabadell and Terrassa.

The origins of the line date from 1863, when a privately owned railway from Barcelona to the then-separated town of Sarrià was opened. In 1912, Catalan engineer Carles Emili Montañès created the company Ferrocarriles de Cataluña (FCC) in order to take control of the line and extend it northwards. After successive extensions, the line reached Terrassa and Sabadell in 1919 and 1922, respectively. In 1977, FCC announced that the whole line was to be closed due to the company's bad economic results. Nevertheless, the Spanish government prevented that from happening by taking control of it. The line was transferred to the Catalan government in 1979, and has been operated by Ferrocarrils de la Generalitat de Catalunya (FGC) ever since. Currently, the most prominent intervention on the line is the extension of the Terrassa and Sabadell branches through the construction of a route underneath the two cities; the former was completed in 2015, whilst the latter did so in 2017.

Barcelona Metro rapid transit lines 6, 7 and 12 serve the line's urban branches within Barcelona, while the rest of the line is operated as a high-frequency commuter rail system known as Vallès Metro. This system further includes the Vallvidrera Funicular, which is also operated by FGC. The Barcelona–Vallès Line is part of the Autoritat del Transport Metropolità (ATM) fare-integrated public transport system for the Barcelona metropolitan area.

History

Terrassa Metro is the name of the current subway in Terrassa, Catalonia, Spain, operated by the Catalan government-owned rail company Ferrocarrils de la Generalitat de Catalunya (FGC). It could be more accurately defined as an underground addition to the already existing FGC commuter train network in the city, located in the metropolitan area of Barcelona.
Construction of the subway line was due to start in 2008 and the date of completion was estimated to be in 2010. The proposed line will link the already existing FGC station Terrassa – Rambla with the Renfe rail line in the city, and will cover a larger portion of the city area, including the Polytechnic University of Catalonia schools located in Terrassa. Construction of the tunnel in Can Roca started in April 2007. Generalitat de Catalunya stated a budget of 178.8 million euros will be available for the construction of the Terrassa Metro, which will be made up of an addition to the Terrassa train stations belonging to the FGC line S1. FGC and Renfe budgets combined sum will sum 321 million euros. Renfe itself is going to build another station in the city: Terrassa Est – Passeig del Camp Parts of the Vallès line operated by FGC are actually known under the collective name of Metro del Vallès since 1996, which will include the Terrassa service and the extension of S2 which will become Sabadell Metro in the almost adjacent municipality of Sabadell, which is already under construction.

Route description
The Barcelona–Vallès Line has its start point at Plaça de Catalunya station, which is located directly underneath El Triangle shopping mall, on the southwesternmost side of Plaça de Catalunya ("Catalonia Square"), a major public transport hub in the Barcelona district of Eixample. The line then continues northwestwards in an underground route along Balmes Street until its intersection with Diagonal Avenue, from this point on running underneath Via Augusta. After Gràcia station, the line branches off thanks to a flying junction, forming a  stretch to Avinguda Tibidabo station. Contrarily to the line's main route, this branch line keeps on running northwestwards, following again Balmes Street up to its northern end, which is also the northern terminus of the branch line.

The main line towards Vallès bends westwards exactly following Via Augusta on its way along the Sarrià-Sant Gervasi district. It branches off again at Sarrià station, forming a  stretch to Reina Elisenda station. The main route, however, continues northwards in a backwards C-shaped route through Barcelona's last streets at the foot of the Collserola mountain range. At this point, the line runs on a succession of alternated open-cut and underground sections before eventually crossing the Vallvidrera neighborhood through a  tunnel in a northwest direction. It then continues going across Collserola's central area above ground, running parallel to C-16 motorway up to Valldoreix station in Sant Cugat del Vallès, passing through Les Planes and La Floresta neighborhoods. Next, the line curves northeasterly, getting closer to Sant Cugat del Vallès city center. It diverges into two main branch lines immediately after Sant Cugat station: the Terrassa branch curves markedly in a west direction, while the Sabadell branch runs northwards.

On the one hand, the stretch to Terrassa continues moving away from Sant Cugat del Vallès in a northwesterly direction towards Rubí, where the line's main depot and operations centre is located. It goes along the western limits of Rubí city centre, describing a straight route northwards to the Les Fonts neighbourhood. The branch line proceeds by slightly curving northwesterly, and penetrates into Terrassa city center through a route underneath Rambla del Pare Alegre and Rambla d'Égara streets. After Terrassa Rambla station, it runs in a S-shaped route, reaching Vallparadís Park, then continuing northwards, terminating at Terrassa Nacions Unides station.

On the other hand, the stretch to Sabadell curves northeasterly as it approaches the end of its route through Sant Cugat del Vallès. It then passes through Cerdanyola del Vallès's Bellaterra neighborhood before curving notably in a southwest direction and, shortly after, again in a northeast direction, reaching the Bellaterra campus of the Autonomous University of Barcelona. Before curving northwesterly, the branch line crosses a part of the campus thanks to a short tunnel and, about  further, it goes through another short tunnel as it bends west. It curves in a north direction towards Sant Quirze del Vallès immediately after. The line then enters Sabadell in a northeast direction, continuing above ground up to Can Feu  Gràcia station; hereafter, running in an underground route terminating at Sabadell Parc del Nord station.

Infrastructure

It is grade-separated in its whole length, running completely underground in central Barcelona, Terrassa and Sabadell. Excepting for the single-track section between Sabadell Estació and Sabadell Rambla stations, the rest of the line has double track. Besides, an additional  line section belonging to the extension of the Sabadell branch is currently under construction. Once completed, it will allow for the dismantling of the line's only remaining single-track section. The signaling and security systems used on the line are centralized traffic control (CTC) and automatic train protection (ATP). The line features standard gauge, unlike Spain's conventional mainline railway system, which features the broader Iberian gauge, and to which it is unconnected.

A total of 34 railway stations are situated along the line, all of which are disabled-accessible. 19 out of 34 stations are underground, while the rest are at-grade, and 6 out of 34 are transfer stations. The opening of the extension of the Sabadell branch will suppose the incorporation of 5 new underground stations, one of which will be a transfer station to the Rodalies de Catalunya commuter and regional rail system.

The line's operation is centralised at Rubí Operations Centre, a rail complex run by Ferrocarrils de la Generalitat de Catalunya (FGC) located south of Rubí station. It contains a repair shop and a depot for the rolling stock as well as the Integrated Control Center (ICC), which includes the CTC center and further serves the Llobregat–Anoia Line. The ICC is also in charge of supervising and regulating the facilities found in the line's stations such as elevators, escalators and ticket vending machines, among other functions. Together with the rest of the Terrassa branch extension project, a small  depot located at the end of the branch line was opened in July 2015. It is known as Can Roca Depot and has a maximum capacity of 8 four-car trains. Before being dismantled in November 2004, there had existed a depot and a repair shop near Barcelona's Sarrià station. In July 2017, an additional major depot was opened north of Sabadell Parc del Nord station as part of the Sabadell branch extension project.

Operation

Rail services
Several rapid transit and commuter rail services run on the Barcelona–Vallès Line, all of them either starting or terminating at Plaça de Catalunya station in central Barcelona (excepting the L12 shuttle services).

Service hours 
The first trains run about 4:30 in the morning to midnight, with later starting times on weekends. Currently, there are no overnight services, though the last trains run just after 2:00 the following morning on Friday and Saturday nights as well as on public holidays. Continuous overnight rapid transit services had previously been offered on Saturdays, though they were suspended to reduce operational costs in January 2012.

Barcelona Metro (L lines) 
Rapid transit services run only on the two urban branch lines within the city of Barcelona and are considered part of the Barcelona Metro system, so that they are numbered and colored consistent with the rest of the system's lines—all Barcelona Metro lines are designated with the letter "L" plus a number, and each is colored distinctly on maps. The services running between Plaça Catalunya and Sarrià are designated L6 and colored deep lavender, the shuttle trains between Sarrià and Reina Elisenda are designated L12 and colored pale lavender, whilst the services running on the Avinguda Tibidabo branch are designated L7 and colored brown. The L7 is also often referred to as Balmes Line. Before , L6 and L7 services were designated U6 and U7, respectively, with the letter "U" standing for "urban", and were not considered part of the Barcelona Metro.

Vallès Metro (S lines) 
Commuter rail services run between Barcelona and other locations in the Vallès area, and are known under the collective name of Vallès Metro. They are designated with the letter "S", which stands for "suburban", plus a number, and have limited stops along their routes. End-to-end services to Terrassa and Sabadell are designated S1 and S2, respectively, and run continuously all-year-around. During rush hours, additional partial services run between Barcelona and other stations in the Vallès area in each direction, operating as skip-stop clones of S1 and S2 services. The partial services running on the Terrassa branch are designated S5 and S7, while the ones on the Sabadell branch are designated S6. During school time, some trains include two of their cars reserved for students. Furthermore, in addition to regular commuter rail services, one train entirely reserved for students is operated in each direction on weekdays.

Frequencies 
The current line scheme allows for peak-time service frequencies of less than 6 minutes in each direction on the Av. Tibidabo, Terrassa and Sabadell branches, and 4 minutes on the Reina Elisenda branch. The overall service frequency increases as the line gets closer to central Barcelona, where the core route between Pl. Catalunya and Gràcia stations provides a headway of less than 2 minutes in each direction during rush hours. Thus, with up to 32 trains per hour in each direction, the Pl. Catalunya–Gràcia section of the Barcelona–Vallès Line is one of Europe's busiest commuter rail lines by number of operations together with RER line A in Paris or portions of the Berlin S-Bahn.

List of Rail services on the Barcelona–Vallès Line

Network

Rolling stock

The trains on the Barcelona–Vallès Line are currently the 112, 113 and 114 Series. There are a total of 66 electrical multiple units, all of which are disabled-accessible, air-conditioned and equipped with the automatic train protection (ATP) security system. The trains are technically very similar, though the 112 Series are notably different than the 113 and 114 Series in their design. They all feature the colors of the Ferrocarrils de la Generalitat de Catalunya (FGC) logo—white and orange.

An initial 16-unit set of 112 Series trains started operating on the line between 1995 and 1996, and another 6-unit set did so in 2003. Considering both their technical features and design, the 112 Series are almost identical to the 213 Series that run on the Llobregat–Anoia Line. The latter, however, feature  and consist of three cars, while the 112 Series feature  and consist of four cars. The entry into service of the first set of 112 Series trains allowed for the implementation of the current Vallès Metro high-frequency line scheme as well as the removal of the former three-car 400 Series in 1996. Together with the Brill 10–27, Brill 301–312 and 600 Series units, the 400 Series were originally operated by Ferrocarriles de Cataluña (FCC) and one unit of each series is preserved as part of FGC's historical rolling stock. The 112 Series is used on services on the Terrassa, Sabadell and Reina Elisenda branches.

Before the entry into service of the 113 and 114 Series throughout 2014, a former 20-unit set of the three-car 111 Series trains had run on the line. These trains started operating between 1983 and 1987, and were the line's first modern electrical multiple units. From January 2014 on, a 19-unit set of the four-car 113 Series trains progressively started operating on the Sabadell, Terrassa and Reina Elisenda branches together with the 112 Series. In December of the same year, a 5-unit set of the three-car 114 Series trains started operating on the Avinguda Tibidabo branch, whose station platforms are too short to hold four-car trains such as the 112 and 113 Series. The 113 and 114 Series are identical in both their technical features and design, though they differ in the number of cars and present some modifications on the seat layout. After the arrival of the 113 and 114 Series, 111 Series trains were removed from circulation and dismantled. Yet, one unit has been preserved as part of FGC's historical rolling stock.

In December 2017, FGC ordered 15 new four-car EMUs, designated the 115 Series, from Stadler Rail's ex-MACOSA facility with entry into service planned for 2019.

List of stations

The following table lists the name of each station on the Barcelona–Vallès Line in order from south to north; a photo of the current station; the rail services operating at the station—L6, L7, L12, S1, S2, S5, S6 and S7—; if applicable, the date the current station was opened; the municipality or the city district (in the case of Barcelona) in which each station is or will be located; the fare zone each station belongs or will belong to according to the Autoritat del Transport Metropolità (ATM) fare-integrated public transport system; remarkable notes about the station, including clarifications, additional information and a location map; and usage figures.

Future

A subway, named Sabadell Metro (Catalan and Spanish: Metro de Sabadell), is planned for Sabadell. It will be operated by the Catalan government-owned rail company Ferrocarrils de la Generalitat de Catalunya. Construction of the subway line started in late 2006 and was due to be finished by 2011 or 2012, depending on which project the FGC finally decided on. However, work was temporarily halted due to the 2008–2014 Spanish financial crisis, but later resumed and the first phase opened in two stages in September 2016 and July 2017.

The proposed line will join the city centre of Sabadell with its northern neighbourhoods, where it will join the Renfe network line, and will effectively link the city with Barcelona through the main FGC lines. The terminus of the current general FGC line, a station called Sabadell – Rambla, will disappear as it will be replaced by this network. The original project, if fulfilled, will be 4.2 km long. It has been criticised for devising a subway line that would run nearly parallel to the Renfe line, which has been deemed not effective enough to suit the needs of a city the size of Sabadell. Also, a civic association called Sabadell Cruïlla has proposed the construction of a larger metro system to link Sabadell with other large cities in the immediate region such as Terrassa and Granollers. In addition to that, it has proposed several changes to the initial project so the subway line would reach Torreromeu and Polinyà.

See also
 Ferrocarrils de la Generalitat de Catalunya
 Barcelona Metro
 Vallvidrera Funicular
 Llobregat–Anoia Line

Maps

Pl. Catalunya – 
Provença – 
Gràcia – 
Pl. Molina – 
Pàdua – 
El Putxet – 
Av. Tibidabo – 
Sant Gervasi – 
Muntaner – 
La Bonanova – 
Les Tres Torres – 
Sarrià – 
Reina Elisenda – 
Peu del Funicular – 
Baixador de Vallvidrera – 
Les Planes – 
La Floresta – 
Valldoreix – 
Sant Cugat – 
Mira-sol – 
Hospital General – 
Rubí – 
Les Fonts – 
Terrassa Rambla – 
Vallparadís Universitat – 
Terrassa Estació del Nord – 
Terrassa Nacions Unides – 
Volpelleres – 
Sant Joan – 
Bellaterra – 
Autonomous University – 
Sant Quirze – 
Can Feu  Gràcia – 
Sabadell Rambla – 
Sabadell Plaça Major – 
Sabadell Eix Macià – 
Sabadell Nord – 
Sabadell Ca n'Oriac –

Notes

References

Bibliography

External links

 Ferrocarrils de la Generalitat de Catalunya (FGC) official website
 Barcelona–Vallès Line at trenscat.cat 
 Barcelona–Vallès Line at Rodalia.info. Real-time status updates of the line by its users via Twitter.
 Photo collection of the Barcelona–Vallès Line on Flickr
 Playlist containing videos of stations on the Barcelona–Vallès Line on YouTube

 
Barcelona Metro lines
Ferrocarrils de la Generalitat de Catalunya
Railway lines in Catalonia
Railway lines opened in 1863
Standard gauge railways in Spain
Rail transport in Barcelona
Transport in Eixample
Transport in Gràcia
Transport in Sabadell
Transport in Sant Cugat del Vallès
Transport in Sarrià-Sant Gervasi
Transport in Terrassa
Transport in Vallès Occidental
1863 establishments in Spain